John Watson (born 3 February 1952) is an Irish equestrian. He competed in the individual eventing at the 1988 Summer Olympics.

References

External links
 

1952 births
Living people
Irish male equestrians
Olympic equestrians of Ireland
Equestrians at the 1988 Summer Olympics
Sportspeople from London